Read Island is an unincorporated locality and census-designated place on the east side of Read Island, near its south end, in the Discovery Islands region of the South Coast of British Columbia, Canada.

See also
Read Island Provincial Park

References

Islands of the Discovery Islands
Designated places in British Columbia
Unincorporated settlements in British Columbia
Populated places in the Strathcona Regional District